Edward Gordon was an Irish international lawn bowler. representing Ireland both indoor and outdoor over 50 times  He won 7 Irish Senior Cup medals, 7 Private Greens Senior League medals, 8 Private  Greens Senior Cups with Falls BC  With Brendan McBrien he won the British Isles Pairs Championship in 1970 and skipped the Fours to British Isles Championship success in 1974  He was a Past President of the Private Greens Bowling League and the Irish Bowling Association

Bowls career
He won a bronze medal in the fours at the 1970 British Commonwealth Games in Edinburgh with John Higgins, William Tate and Harold Stevenson.

References

Male lawn bowls players from Northern Ireland
Commonwealth Games bronze medallists for Northern Ireland
Commonwealth Games medallists in lawn bowls
Bowls players at the 1970 British Commonwealth Games
Year of birth missing
Possibly living people
Medallists at the 1970 British Commonwealth Games